Nickolas R. Pisciottano (born January 12, 1990) is an American elected official serving as a member of the Pennsylvania House of Representatives for the 38th legislative district which includes nine municipalities across the Monongahela Valley and South Hills regions of Allegheny County. Nick was first elected in 2020.

Education
Pisciottano graduated as class valedictorian from West Mifflin Area High School before earning bachelor's degrees in Accounting and History from Washington & Jefferson College. He later earned a master's degree in Government Analytics from Johns Hopkins University. While at Hopkins, his research focused on the concept of social capital culminating is his capstone thesis, “The Impact of the Internet on Social Capital: Broadband Access and Influences on Voting Turnout.”

Career
After graduation from Washington & Jefferson, Nick worked as an auditor at KPMG earning his Certified Public Accountant license in 2014. Outside of his professional career, Nick was active in his community volunteering as the president of the West Mifflin Community Foundation and as a student mentor with Big Brothers, Big Sisters of Greater Pittsburgh.

In 2020, Pisciottano was elected to the Pennsylvania House of Representatives for the 38th District succeeding the retiring Rep. William C. Kortz. His campaign focused on protecting workers’ rights, economic development, education reform, and providing high-quality constituent services.

Committee assignments 

 Commerce
 Labor & Industry
 Tourism & Recreational Development

Personal life
Pisciottano was born and raised in West Mifflin, Pennsylvania hailing from a family that settled in the area before the Civil War. He married his wife Molly in 2018 and they live together with their son Nico and two rescue dogs in West Mifflin.

References

External links
 Official Website
 Nick for PA Campaign Website

Democratic Party members of the Pennsylvania House of Representatives
People from West Mifflin, Pennsylvania
Washington & Jefferson College alumni
Johns Hopkins University alumni
1990 births
Living people